Phacelia stellaris is a rare species of flowering plant in the borage family, Boraginaceae, known by the common names star phacelia and Brand's phacelia.

Endangered habitat
It is native to coastal sage scrub and beach dunes on the coast of southern California and Baja California, where it is known from only a few occurrences. Its status is uncertain, as most of its recorded occurrences are in areas that have since been disturbed or degraded in this highly developed coastal region. There are confirmed populations around San Diego and along the Santa Ana River. The plant is a current candidate for federal protection as a threatened or endangered species in the United States.

Description
Phacelia stellaris is an annual herb producing a spreading, branching stem up to about 25 centimeters long and lightly hairy in texture. The leaves are lance-shaped to oval with lobed edges, sometimes divided into smaller leaflets. The hairy inflorescence is a one-sided curving or coiling cyme of bell-shaped flowers, each roughly half a centimeter long. The five-lobed flowers are pale blue or purple in color.

See also
California chaparral and woodlands 
California coastal sage and chaparral ecoregion

References

External links
Jepson Manual Treatment of Phacelia stellaris
Phacelia stellaris — UC Photo gallery

stellaris
Flora of California
Flora of Baja California
Natural history of the California chaparral and woodlands
Natural history of San Diego County, California
Natural history of Orange County, California
Santa Ana River